Mark Babic (born 24 April 1973) is a former Australian soccer played who played as a defender.

Early life
Babic was born in Australia to parents who had emigrated from Croatia.

Playing career

Club career
He played in the NSL between 1989 and 2003 with clubs St George Saints, Sydney United and Marconi Stallions. With Sydney United he played 137 games for the club between 1989 and 1997 and played 102 games for Marconi between 1997 and 2003.

International career
Babic represented Australia at all levels, including playing all six games for the Australian U-20 team at the 1991 FIFA World Youth Championship in Portugal where Australia finished 4th and playing all 3 games for the Australian U-23's at the 1996 Summer Olympic games. He also was capped 8 times at senior level for Australia between 1997 and 1998.

References

1973 births
Living people
Australian people of Croatian descent
Australian soccer players
Australia international soccer players
Olympic soccer players of Australia
National Soccer League (Australia) players
Marconi Stallions FC players
Sydney United 58 FC players
Association football central defenders
Footballers at the 1996 Summer Olympics
1998 OFC Nations Cup players